Guy Zinn (February 13, 1887 – October 6, 1949) was an American professional baseball outfielder. He played all or part of five seasons in Major League Baseball from 1911 to 1915.

Baseball career
Zinn played his first game on September 11, 1911, for the New York Highlanders of the American League. On April 20, 1912 he scored the first-ever run at Fenway Park. 

In 1912, he played 106 games for the Highlanders with 105 hits and 6 home runs (fourth in the American League) with 55 runs batted in. The next season, in 1913, he played for the Boston Braves of the National League, hitting .297 in 36 games. 

He played his final two seasons for the Baltimore Terrapins of the Federal League, garnering 147 hits and 8 home runs over that period. He played his last game on September 16, 1915 with Baltimore. His career batting average was .269, with 297 hits.

References

External links
, or Retrosheet, or Baseball Almanac

1887 births
1949 deaths
Altoona Rams players
Baltimore Terrapins players
Baseball players from West Virginia
Boston Braves players
Bridgeport Americans players
Grafton (minor league baseball) players
Hamilton Tigers (baseball) players
Jersey City Skeeters players
Jewish American baseball players
Jewish Major League Baseball players
Louisville Colonels (minor league) players
Major League Baseball outfielders
Macon Peaches players
Memphis Turtles players
New Orleans Pelicans (baseball) players
New York Highlanders players
Newark Bears (IL) players
Rochester Hustlers players
Scranton Miners players
Toledo Mud Hens players
Wilkes-Barre Barons (baseball) players